This list is of the Places of Scenic Beauty of Japan located within the Prefecture of Nagasaki.

National Places of Scenic Beauty
As of 1 August 2019, seven Places have been designated at a national level (including one *Special Place of Scenic Beauty).

Prefectural Places of Scenic Beauty
As of 1 May 2019, one Place has been designated at a prefectural level.

Municipal Places of Scenic Beauty
As of 1 May 2019, seven Places have been designated at a municipal level.

Registered Places of Scenic Beauty
As of 1 August 2019, three Monuments have been registered (as opposed to designated) as Places of Scenic Beauty at a national level.

See also
 Cultural Properties of Japan
 List of Historic Sites of Japan (Nagasaki)
 List of parks and gardens of Nagasaki Prefecture

References

External links
  National Cultural Properties in Nagasaki Prefecture
  Prefectural Cultural Properties in Nagasaki Prefecture

Tourist attractions in Nagasaki Prefecture
Places of Scenic Beauty